Carlos Correa (30 April 1936 – 24 May 2013) was a Uruguayan footballer. He played in nine matches for the Uruguay national football team in 1957. He was also part of Uruguay's squad for the 1957 South American Championship.

References

1936 births
2013 deaths
Uruguayan footballers
Uruguay international footballers
Place of birth missing
Association football defenders
Club Nacional de Football players
Danubio F.C. players